is a former Japanese football player.

Playing career
Keisuke Matsumoto played for MIO Biwako Shiga and Grulla Morioka from 2011 to 2015.

References

External links

1988 births
Living people
Kwansei Gakuin University alumni
Association football people from Aichi Prefecture
Japanese footballers
J3 League players
Japan Football League players
MIO Biwako Shiga players
Iwate Grulla Morioka players
Association football midfielders